The 2007–08 Clemson Tigers men's basketball team represents Clemson University. The head coach is Oliver Purnell. The team plays its home games in Littlejohn Coliseum in Clemson, South Carolina.

Post-season

2008 ACC tournament
The Tigers entered the tournament seeded third in the conference, their highest seeding since their 1989–90 team won the regular-season championship. After defeating Boston College in their first game, the Tigers advanced to the ACC Tournament Final for the first time in 46 years (1962) and only the second time in school history by knocking off the #7 Duke Blue Devils by a score of 78–74. In the finals, they were defeated by #1 North Carolina 86–81.

2008 NCAA tournament
Clemson received the #5 seed in the Midwest region of the 2008 NCAA Tournament. It was the first time in 10 years that the Tigers made the field of 64. After building as much as an 18-point lead in the first half, the Tigers eventually fell to the #12 seed Wildcats by a final of 75–69. This marked the first time in NCAA Tournament history that 4 lower seeded teams (Villanova, Siena, Kansas State, Davidson) from one region (Midwest) all advanced to the second round.

2007–08 roster

Schedule and results

|-
!colspan=9| Exhibition

|-
!colspan=9| Regular season

|-
!colspan=9| ACC tournament

|-
!colspan=9| NCAA tournament

Rankings

References 

Clemson
Clemson Tigers men's basketball seasons
Clemson